Puerto Rico competed in the Winter Olympic Games for the first time at the 1984 Winter Olympics in Sarajevo, Yugoslavia.

The territory's only representative was George Tucker, who finished last in the luge event.

Luge

Men

References
Official Olympic Reports
 Olympic Winter Games 1984, full results by sports-reference.com

1984 in Puerto Rican sports
Nations at the 1984 Winter Olympics
1984 Winter Olympics